Friedrich-Wilhelm Kiel (17 May 1934 – 4 April 2022) was a German politician and member of the FDP.

Kiel studied physics, mathematics, and sport at the Karlsruhe Institute of Technology and became a member of the FDP in 1964 whilst teaching at a gymnasium in Ettlingen, where he later became mayor (1966–1970). In 1970, Kiel became mayor of Pforzheim, until 1976, when he was elected to become mayor of Fellbach, a position he held until 2000.

From 1992 until 2001, Kiel was also a member of the Landtag of Baden-Württemberg. For his services to the state, minister-president Erwin Teufel awarded him the Order of Merit of Baden-Württemberg on 5 May 2001. Kiel was made an honorary citizen of Fellbach and the Hungarian city Pécs, whilst the University of Pécs appointed him an honorary senator of their educational establishment.

References 

 Biography of Friedrich-Wilhelm Kiel from the Landtag of Baden-Württemberg

Further reading 
 

1934 births
2022 deaths
Politicians from Berlin
Karlsruhe Institute of Technology alumni
Free Democratic Party (Germany) politicians
Mayors of places in Baden-Württemberg
Members of the Landtag of Baden-Württemberg
Recipients of the Order of Merit of Baden-Württemberg